Higson is an English surname. Notable people with the surname include:

Allison Higson, Canadian swimmer
Charlie Higson, British actor, author and singer
James Higson, English footballer
Joanna Higson, English actress
John Higson, English rugby player, father of Leonard
Kenneth Higson, Canadian politician
Leonard Higson, English rugby player, son of John

See also
3025 Higson, an asteroid
Higsons (disambiguation)